Jang Hak-Yong (Hangul: 장학영, born August 24, 1981) is South Korean footballer.

In May 2010, he left his team to complete his mandatory military service.

A pacey and consistent left back, Jang was twice named in the official K-League Team of the Season, in 2006 and 2007. He also played for the Korean national team on five occasions.

Club career statistics

External links
 
 National Team Player Record 
 

1981 births
Living people
Association football defenders
South Korean footballers
South Korea international footballers
Seongnam FC players
Busan IPark players
K League 1 players
K League 2 players
K3 League players